The County of Grande Prairie No. 1 is a municipal district in northwestern Alberta, Canada  in Census Division No. 19.

It is bounded on the south by the Wapiti River, on the east by the Smoky River and on the west by the province of British Columbia.

Geography

Communities and localities 
The following urban municipalities are surrounded by the County of Grande Prairie No. 1.
Cities
Grande Prairie
Towns
Beaverlodge
Sexsmith
Wembley
Villages
none
Summer villages
none

The following hamlets are located within the County of Grande Prairie No. 1.
Hamlets
Bezanson
Clairmont
Demmitt
Dimsdale
Elmworth
Goodfare
Huallen
Hythe
La Glace
Teepee Creek
Valhalla Centre
Wedgewood

The following localities are located within the County of Grande Prairie No. 1.
Localities

 

Albright
Aspen Ridge Estates
Aspen Ridge Subdivision
Bad Heart
Bear Lake
Brainard
Bredin
Buffalo Lake
Clairmont Trailer Court
Fitzsimmons
Flying Shot
Flyingshot Lake Settlement (designated place and settlement)
Glen Leslie
Grande Prairie Aerodrome
Gundy
Halcourt
Hayfield
Hazelmere

Hermit Lake
Hilltop Estates
Hinton Trail
Hockey Estates
Homestead
J D Barr Subdivision
J.D. Renton Subdivision
J.D. Willis Subdivision
Kleskun Hill
Lake Saskatoon
Lakeview Estates
Leighmore
Lymburn
Lynburn
Mansfield Subdivision
Maple Grove
Morgan's Mountain Subdivision

Mount Valley
Mountainside Acres
Mountainside Estates
Niobe
Nordhagen Subdivision
Pine Valley Estates
Pine Valley Subdivision
Pipestone Creek
Poplar Hill
Research Station
Richmond Hill Estates
Richmond Subdivision
Rio Grande
Riverview Pines Estates
Riverview Pines Subdivision (designated place)
Sandy Lane
Sandy Lanes

Sandy Ridge Estates
Shaver
Silvestre
Smoky Heights
South Pine Valley Estates
Sprucewood Subdivision
Swan City Trailer Court (designated place)
Sylvester
The Dunes
Triple-L-Trailer Court (designated place)
Valhalla
Webster
Willow Wood Subdivision
Willowood Estates
Windsor Creek
Woodlake Estates
Woodland Acres

Horse Lakes 152B is an Indian reserves located within the County of Grande Prairie No. 1.

Demographics 

In the 2016 Census of Population conducted by Statistics Canada, the County of Grande Prairie No. 1 had a population of 22,303 living in 7,684 of its 8,291 total private dwellings, a  change from its 2011 population of 19,724.

The County of Grande Prairie No. 1 conducted a municipal census in 2012, which resulted in an estimated population of 21,157, a 17.6% increase over its 2006 municipal census population of 17,989.

See also 
List of communities in Alberta
List of municipal districts in Alberta

References

External links 

 
Grande Prairie